The cast of the television series MythBusters perform experiments to verify or debunk urban legends, old wives' tales, and the like. This is a list of the various myths tested on the show as well as the results of the experiments (the myth is Busted, Plausible, or Confirmed). The 2013 season premiered on May 1, 2013, returning to its Wednesday time slot.

Episode overview

Episode 197 – "JATO Rocket Car: Mission Accomplished?"
 Original air date: May 1, 2013
This was the first of two "10th Anniversary" episodes.

JATO 3: Mission Accomplished?

Episode 198 – "Deadliest Catch Crabtastic Special"
 Original air date: May 8, 2013
This episode aired out of order on Discovery Channel in the United States, as the small-scale test for "Killer Loop" briefly referenced the small-scale test for "Crash Cushion".
For all three myths, Adam, Jamie, Tory, Kari and Grant were joined by two Deadliest Catch captains - F/V Time Bandit captain Johnathan Hillstrand and Seabrooke captain Scott Campbell Jr.

Killer Loop

Crab Napping
Inspired by Bering Sea crab boat shifts lasting as long as 30 hours, which leads to some captains swearing by this myth.

Indestructible Pot

Episode 199 – "Down and Dirty/Earthquake Survival"
 Original air date: May 15, 2013

Down and Dirty

Stall Number 1

Earthquake Emergency

Episode 200 – "Indy Car Special"
 Original air date: May 22, 2013

Man vs. Car

Manhole Mishap

Sweaty Speed

Episode 201 – "Battle of the Sexes: Round 2"
 Original air date: May 29, 2013

Man Throw

Multi-Tasking Talent

Ask for Directions

Parking Power

Observation Skills
This segment was cut from the episode when it aired in the United States.

Episode 202 – "Motorcycle Water Ski"
 Original US air date: June 5, 2013
 Original Australia air date: May 6, 2013

Motorcycle Mayhem

Homemade Parachute

Episode 203 – "Hypermiling/Crash Cushions"
 Original US air date: June 12, 2013
 Original Australia air date: May 27, 2013

Crash Cushion

Hypermiling

Episode 204 – "Duct Tape Canyon"
 Original air date: June 19, 2013
The Build Team does not appear in this episode.

Duct Tape Canyon Special
In this spiritual successor to Duct Tape Island, Adam and Jamie are stranded in a barren wasteland near Desolation Canyon, Utah with only duct tape, bubble wrap and a few other basic staples (e.g. food, water and a knife), and must depend on these limited resources to cross the canyon and reach civilization. Features a cameo appearance by Nik Wallenda to promote the Discovery Channel special Skywire Live, which aired the weekend following the original airing of this episode.

Adam and Jamie's goals were to...

Episode 205 – "Painting With Explosives/Bifurcated Boat"
 Original air date: June 26, 2013
This was the second of two "10th Anniversary" episodes.

Painting with Explosives
Adam and Jamie decided to revisit the myth of Painting with Explosives, based on the episode "Do-It-Yourself Mr. Bean" of the British comedy series Mr. Bean starring Rowan Atkinson. They tested to find out if a small room could be painted with explosives using...

Bifurcated Boat

Episode 206 – "Breaking Bad Special"
 Original US air date: August 12, 2013
 Original Australia air date: July 15, 2013

This episode features myths drawn from the AMC drama series Breaking Bad, which had been teased since it was reported as early as the year before by Entertainment Weekly. Guesting in this episode are show creator/producer Vince Gilligan and co-starring actor Aaron Paul (Jesse Pinkman).

The episode had already been aired in several international markets (such as on SBSOne on July 15, 2013 and on Discovery Channel Southeast Asia on July 22, 2013) before making its US debut on August 12, 2013. The late US airing was timed to coincide with Breaking Bad'''s final season (second half) premiere the night before.

Crazy Handful

As a postscript, in the 2015 episode Blow It Out of the Water, Adam and Jamie – with Gilligan present – also tested the viability of Walter's jury-rigged car trunk machine gun trap in Felina, the Breaking Bad series finale, and found it plausible.

Episode 207 – "Zombie Special"
 Original air date: October 17, 2013
This special episode was timed to air in the US immediately following the Discovery Channel special Apocalypse Preppers and in the same week as the season 4 premiere of The Walking Dead. Features a special guest appearance by Michael Rooker, who portrayed Merle Dixon in seasons 1–3 of The Walking Dead''.

Axe vs. Gun

Dead Heat

Power of the Push

References

General references

External links

 
 

2013
2013 American television seasons